Father or Mother of the House is an unofficial title applied to the longest-serving member of Parliament (MP) sitting in the New Zealand House of Representatives. In New Zealand, no duties or special distinctions are associated with the position.

The position is usually determined by continuous service, not aggregate time in parliament. When more than one MP have served equally long periods, the title is usually assigned to whoever was sworn in first, a process which happens alphabetically by surname.

The current Father of the House is Gerry Brownlee, and the current Mother of the House is Nanaia Mahuta. They have served continuously in the House of Representatives since 12 October 1996.

In the subsequent General Assembly of 1854, Carleton liked to be known as the Father of the House.

In March 2005 then Prime Minister Helen Clark became the first to be dubbed Mother of the House.

List of Fathers and Mother of the House
Key

Table footnotes:

See also
 Baby of the House for youngest MPs when first elected. 
 Father of the House, for similar traditions in other country's legislatures

Notes

References 

Lists of political office-holders in New Zealand
Members of the New Zealand House of Representatives
New Zealand